The Deerslayer and Chingachgook is the feature-length first part of the two-part 1920 German silent Western film Lederstrumpf (Leatherstocking), directed by Arthur Wellin and featuring Bela Lugosi. It is based on the 1841 novel The Deerslayer by James Fenimore Cooper. The second part is called The Last of the Mohicans (Der Letzte der Mohikaner).

Cast
 Emil Mamelok as Deerslayer
 Herta Heden as Judith Hutter
 Bela Lugosi as Chingachgook
 Gottfried Kraus as Tom Hutter
 Edward Eyseneck as Worley
 Margot Sokolowska as Wah-ta-Wah
 Frau Rehberger as Judith Hutter
 Willy Schroeder as Hartherz
 Herr Söhnlein as Col. Munro
 Heddy Sven as Cora Munro
 Frau Wenkhaus as Alice Munro

See also
 Bela Lugosi filmography
 List of rediscovered films

References

External links
 
 

1920 films
1920 Western (genre) films
1920s rediscovered films
Films based on American novels
Films based on works by James Fenimore Cooper
Films of the Weimar Republic
Films set in New York (state)
Films set in the 1740s
Films set in the Thirteen Colonies
German black-and-white films
Rediscovered German films
Silent German Western (genre) films
Films directed by Arthur Wellin
1920s German films